Affeln is a German village in Neuenrade, a municipality in Märkischer Kreis, North Rhine-Westphalia. Before 1975 it was considered an autonomous municipality.

Geography
It is located in Homert Natural Park in the east of Neuenrade and in north of Plettenberg.

Traditions
 Schützenfest

See also
 Neuenrade
 Küntrop

References

External links

Neuenrade
Villages in North Rhine-Westphalia